Rayburn College was founded in 1994. It is situated at New Lamka which about 62 kilometers from the state capital of Manipur, Imphal and 2 kilometers from the heart of the town, Lamka. The college is named after the American pastor and educator Robert G. Rayburn.

Programmes offered
The college initially provides education up to Higher-Secondary initially in the streams of Arts, Science and Commerce. Recently, Under Graduate programs were also being offered. As of 2009, the college has a total strength of 1133 students in the Higher-Secondary and a total of 63 students in the various Under Graduate Program offered.
The college is having the largest Faculties and Students in Churachandpur and perhaps one of the largest Colleges in Manipur.

Affiliation
The college is affiliated under Council of Higher Education, Manipur, University Grant Commission.
The official website is rayburncollege.ac.in

References

Universities and colleges in Manipur
Churachandpur district
Educational institutions established in 1994
1994 establishments in Manipur